Stony Creek (formerly Stoney Creek) is a rural locality in the Moreton Bay Region of Queensland, Australia. In the  Stony Creek had a population of 262 people.

Geography

The locality is bounded to the south by the Stanley River and to the south-west by Mary Smokes Creek.

The D'Aguilar Highway enters the locality from the east (Woodford) and exits to the west (Royston).

Most of the residential land use is along the D'Aguilar Highway and Stony Creek Road. There are small areas of forestry and cropping, but the predominant land use in the locality is grazing on native vegetation.

History

Stony Creek Provisional School opened circa 1877. On 1 January 1909, it became Stony Creek State School. Due to low student numbers, it closed in 1914.

The Durundur Provisional School opened on 5 July 1897. In 1909 it became Durundur State School. It was renamed Kalangara State School in 1920. The school closed on 25 August 1963. The school was on Stony Creek Road. There was a hall adjacent to the school.

The median age of the Stony Creek population was 45 years, 8 years above the national median of 37. 82.8% of people living in Stony Creek were born in Australia. The other top responses for country of birth were New Zealand 3.4%, England 3.1%, Vanuatu 1.2%, Scotland 0.9%, Italy 0.9%. 90.7% of people spoke only English at home; the next most common languages were 0.9% Pacific Austronesian Languages, nec, 0.9% French, 0.9%.

Education
There are no schools in Stony Creek. The nearest government primary schools are Woodford State School in neighbouring Woodford to the south-east and Mount Kilcoy State School in Mount Kilcoy to the north-west. The nearest government secondary schools are Woodford State School (to Year 10) and Kilcoy State High School in Kilcoy to the south-west.

Notable people
 Denver Beanland attended the Kalangara State School

References

Suburbs of Moreton Bay Region
Localities in Queensland